Disney's Aladdin is a platform game based on the 1992 film of the same name developed by Virgin Games USA. The game was released by Sega for the Sega Genesis on November 11, 1993 as one of several games based on the film, including another game that was released in the same month by Capcom for the Super NES.

The game is one of the best-selling Genesis games with four million copies sold. It also received a number of adapted ports for other platforms, such as the NES, Game Boy, Amiga, and DOS computers.

Gameplay
Disney's Aladdin is a side-scrolling platform game in which the player controls Aladdin throughout settings and a storyline based on the namesake film. Aladdin's primary forms of offense against enemy characters are a scimitar for short-range slashing attacks and apples that can be pelted as long-range ammunition. The apples are a finite resource, but can be collected in abundant amounts throughout the game. Aladdin's health is indicated by a trail of smoke emanating from the Genie's lamp on the top-left corner of the screen. The trail shortens whenever Aladdin is harmed by an enemy or environmental hazard. Health can be restored by collecting blue Genie Hearts scattered throughout the levels. If Aladdin runs out of health, a life will be lost. Blue vases within the levels act as checkpoints from which Aladdin will be revived if he had passed one before losing a life. Extra lives can be received by collecting golden icons in the shape of Aladdin's head hidden in the levels. If Aladdin's last life is lost, the game prematurely ends. The amount of lives and apples Aladdin is equipped with at the start of the game is determined by the difficulty setting, which can be adjusted in the main menu. Aside from apples, Aladdin can collect gems, which can be traded with the Peddler in each level for extra lives and "wishes". Wishes allow the player to continue the game from the current level after losing their last life instead of having to start again from the beginning. On occasion, "smart bombs" in the form of Jafar's lamp can be found and triggered, which will result in the elimination of all on-screen enemies.

If the player collects one or more Genie Tokens and clears a level, the player will be taken to the "Genie's Bonus Machine", a luck-based minigame in which pressing a button rewards the player with a random prize consisting of a gem, five apples or an extra life. The amount of Genie Tokens collected in a level determines the amount of rounds that can be played in the minigame. When the player runs out of Genie Tokens or if they land on a picture of Jafar, the minigame will end. If the player picks up an Abu Token in two levels, a bonus level featuring Aladdin's pet monkey Abu as the player character will initiate following the Genie's Bonus Machine. In these levels, the player must maneuver Abu left and right to collect gems, apples and extra lives that drop to the ground while avoiding pots, rocks, fish, Iago's cousins, palace guards and other hazards. If Abu comes into contact with a hazard, the bonus level ends.

Development
Following the theatrical release of Aladdin, Sega and Capcom each acquired a license to create a video game based on the film for the Sega Genesis and SNES respectively, both companies having an established track record for quality licensed Disney titles. Sega originally tasked development of the game to BlueSky Software, who had previously developed Ariel the Little Mermaid, and set a fall 1993 release for Aladdin. At the time, Sega and BlueSky prioritized Jurassic Park, another licensed title that was set for a summer 1993 release. Because of this, BlueSky only assigned a small team of around eight people to work on Aladdin, which slowed the project's pace. Although morale was high amongst the staff, Disney producer Patrick Gilmore was dissatisfied with the lack of progress compared to Capcom's version; he felt that the artwork failed to reflect the film's visual style and that the overall game did nothing to revolutionize licensed platformers. With Disney's management unwilling to allow the license to be secondary to another property, they decided to cancel BlueSky's game and hire a new developer. BlueSky's Jurassic Park game contains an Easter egg referencing Aladdin within its in-game map; an upside-down Genie's lamp is disguised as a mountain range. The experience with BlueSky convinced Disney Feature Animation to start taking a more active role in the development of video game adaptations of its properties, particularly in the artwork and character animation.

During the 1992 Consumer Electronics Show (CES), Gilmore met Virgin Games design director David Bishop and was impressed by the company's work on Global Gladiators, which resulted in Disney and Virgin beginning a collaboration to create a licensed game based on The Jungle Book. Gilmore's superiors would in turn be impressed by Virgin's regard for Disney's animated features as well as their progress on The Jungle Book. By the time of the cancellation of BlueSky's Aladdin, the two companies were searching for further ways to work together. At the following CES, Bishop and Virgin Vice President of Product Development Stephen Clarke-Wilson approached Gilmore with DynoBlaze, a game demo created by Bill Kroyer that stalled following Virgin's acquisition of major licenses. Gilmore, once again impressed, requested permission to shop the demo around Disney. Shortly thereafter, Bishop was summoned by Disney to watch a rough cut of Aladdin, and was pitched the idea of creating an Aladdin video game using Disney's own animation. Bishop was then tasked to create a proof of concept that would convince Disney to grant Virgin the Aladdin license. A group consisting of Bishop, Seth Mendelsohn, Mark Yamada, and Mike Dietz created the game's design document over several marathon sessions while locked in an apartment for days. Bishop then pulled designer Bill Anderson away from production on The Jungle Book and gave him one day to create a draft of the game's first level, which he submitted the following morning. Virgin Interactive President Martin Alper drove to Los Angeles to pitch the design document and draft level to Disney Feature Animation, and he succeeded in obtaining the Aladdin license for Virgin.

Development on Aladdin at Virgin started in January 1993, with a deadline of October 1993 to complete production set to coincide with the home video release of the film; this deadline left Virgin with about three-quarters the normal amount of time to build a game. A second team continued work on The Jungle Book, with the main group transitioning back upon Aladdins completion. Because of Disney's increased role in production, Alper negotiated with Sega and arranged an agreement that allowed Sega to assume a marketing and distribution role, as well as entitle them to an equal share with Virgin and Disney. The deal was the first of its kind among major console publishers. The terms included several assurances to Disney, such as an equal marketing budget to Sega's other major titles, a release date that did not compete with a Sonic the Hedgehog title, an initial circulation of a million units in the United States, and granting Jeffrey Katzenberg the final word on all marketing materials. Aside from promotion and distribution, Sega would play no role in Aladdins development other than quality assurance. According to Clarke-Wilson, while Sega obtained significant brand recognition through its association with a high profile Disney product, they made no money from the arrangement due to the deal's structure, in which the three companies deducted their costs from the total revenue and divided the remaining profits equally.

Visuals
A team of ten animators worked on the animation frames, making it the first video game to use hand-drawn animation. The work was then shipped to Virgin's California facility to be digitized. The game used traditional animation via digital ink and paint, which was produced by Disney animators under the supervision of Virgin's animation staff, including animation producer Andy Luckey, technical director Paul Schmiedeke and animation director Mike Dietz, using an in-house "Digicel" process to compress the data onto the cartridge.

Audio
Virgin Games composer Tommy Tallarico assigned Donald Griffin to arrange five of the film's musical themes, as well as create five original pieces. Griffin would reduce the film's songs to smaller MIDI files and return them to Tallarico, who converted the songs note for note by employing a channel normally dedicated to samples to replicate the film's music as closely as possible. Tallarico also composed the game's incidental transition music.

Release
The game was showcased at the 1993 Summer Consumer Electronics Show. Jeffrey Katzenberg allocated a budget for the game's launch of $250,000.

The Amiga and DOS were based on the Mega Drive/Genesis version, featuring enhanced music, sound effects and an Updated HUD. The Game Boy and Nintendo Entertainment System ports, which are similar to each other, are significantly altered from the original version, with elements from the original version being missing in both versions, including the "Inside The Lamp" and Abu bonus levels. The Game Boy version is compatible with the Super Game Boy. These versions of the game were developed by NMS Software, a short-lived company in the mid 1990s that was founded by former Elite Systems staff. A Windows 95 port was developed by East Point Software and published by Virgin Interactive Entertainment in 1996. The Game Boy Color port, developed by Crawfish Interactive and published by Ubi Soft in 2000, is more faithful to the Genesis port, with more things being retained from the original while still missing some content. A Sega CD version of Aladdin was planned, but never started official development.

The Genesis, Game Boy, and Super Game Boy versions of the game were included alongside The Lion King as part of Disney Classic Games: Aladdin and The Lion King, released for the Nintendo Switch, PlayStation 4, Windows, and Xbox One on October 29, 2019. These versions include instant save states, a "rewind" button, level select, and options for invulnerability and infinite lives. The collection also includes the trade show demo of the Genesis version, as well as a "Final Cut" version that includes new areas, boss patterns, graphical effects, and other changes. The compilation game was updated as Disney Classic Games Collection: Aladdin, The Lion King, and The Jungle Book, and includes the SNES, Genesis, and Game Boy versions of The Jungle Book as well as the SNES version of Aladdin. It was set to be released on November 9, 2021, but was delayed until November 23.

Canceled sequel
In a "Devs Play" session with Double Fine in 2014, Louis Castle, co-founder of Westwood Studios who later worked on The Lion King, revealed that the studio had pitched a second Aladdin game that would have featured pre-rendered 3D sprites, around the same time as the Amiga game Stardust and a year prior to their use in Donkey Kong Country, but the project was scrapped by Disney.

Reception

Sales
Upon its first week of release, Sega shipped  Aladdin units worldwide, including 800,000 in the United States and another 800,000 in Europe; half of the European shipments were hardware bundles. The same month, it topped Babbage's Sega Genesis sales chart in the United States. The game went on to sell four million copies worldwide, making it the third best-selling Sega Genesis game of all-time, after Sonic the Hedgehog and Sonic the Hedgehog 2.

Critical response
On release, Famicom Tsūshin scored the Mega Drive version of Aladdin a 35 out of 40. The game was awarded Best Genesis Game of 1993 by Electronic Gaming Monthly. They also awarded it Best Animation. The game was reviewed in 1994 in Dragon #211 by Jay & Dee in the "Eye of the Monitor" column. Both reviewers gave the game 5 out of 5 stars.

Levi Buchanan of IGN gave the game an 8/10, calling the game "a platformer that proved the Genesis, while aging, was still quite capable of great gameplay and delightful artwork".

Accolades 
Mega placed the game at #12 in their Top Mega Drive Games of All Time. In 1995, Flux magazine rated the game 13th on their Top 100 Video Games. They praised the smooth animation, detail and the gameplay saying that: "Disney's Aladdin for the Genesis one of the best action/platform games in history." In the same year, MegaZone included the game in their Top 50 Games In History summarizing: "The animation in this platformer us simply astounding and looks more like a cartoon then a video game. Some superb humorous touches too." In 2009, GamesRadar ranked the game fourth on their list of the seven best Disney games, comparing it to the SNES game: "While the SNES Aladdin fell back upon faux 3D shading and single pixel button-eyes, the Genesis version looked infinitely more fluid and expressive." In 2017, GamesRadar ranked the game 18th on its "Best Sega Genesis/Mega Drive games of all time" and praised the game's graphics and sound saying that it captures the look and music from the film.

References

External links

1993 video games
Aladdin (franchise) video games
Amiga 1200 games
Cancelled Sega CD games
DOS games ported to Windows
Game Boy games
Game Boy Color games
Nintendo Entertainment System games
Virgin Interactive games
THQ games
Platform games
Sega Genesis games
Single-player video games
Video games designed by David Perry
Video games scored by Allister Brimble
Video games scored by Mark Cooksey
Video games scored by Tommy Tallarico
Video games with digitized sprites
Video games set in the Middle East
Crawfish Interactive games
Video games developed in the United States
NMS Software games
Promethean Designs games